The Jewel of the Nile is a 1985 American action-adventure romantic comedy film directed by Lewis Teague and produced by Michael Douglas, who also starred in the lead role, and reunites with co-stars Kathleen Turner and Danny DeVito all reprising their roles. It is the sequel to the 1984 action-adventure romantic comedy film Romancing the Stone.

Like Romancing the Stone, the opening scene takes place in one of Joan's novels. This time, instead of Jesse and Angelina in Joan's wild-west scenario, Joan and Jack are about to be married when pirates attack their ship. The Jewel of the Nile sends its characters off on a new adventure in a fictional African desert, in an effort to find the fabled "Jewel of the Nile".

The song performed by Billy Ocean, "When the Going Gets Tough, the Tough Get Going", became a major international hit, reaching #1 in the UK and #2 in the US.

Plot
Six months after the events in Romancing the Stone, Joan Wilder's (Kathleen Turner) and Jack Colton's (Michael Douglas) romance has grown stale. While moored at a port in the South of France, Joan, suffering writer's block, wants to return to New York, while Jack prefers aimlessly sailing the world on his boat, the Angelina. At a book signing engagement, Joan meets Omar Khalifa (Spiros Focás), a charming Arab ruler who wants Joan to write his biography.

Joan accepts and leaves with Omar over Jack's protests. Jack later runs into Ralph (Danny DeVito), the swindler from Jack and Joan's previous adventure in Colombia, who demands Jack turn over the stone Jack and Joan found. Shortly after, an Arab, Tarak (Paul David Magid), informs Jack about Omar's true intentions and claims that Omar has the "Jewel of the Nile"; just as Tarak finishes his explanations, the Angelina explodes from a bomb set by one of Omar's men. Ralph and Jack team up to find Joan and the fabled jewel.

Joan soon discovers that Omar is a brutal dictator rather than the enlightened ruler he claimed will unite the Arab world. In the palace jail, Joan encounters Al-Julhara (Avner Eisenberg), a holy man who is, in fact, the "Jewel of the Nile" and whom Omar fears. Al-Julhara tells Joan that Omar plans to declare himself ruler of all of the Arab world at a ceremony in the city of Kadir.

Realizing that Al-Julhara is the only one who can stop Omar, Joan decides to escort him to Kadir herself. The pair escape and find Jack, and they flee into the desert in Omar's hijacked F-16 fighter jet. Ralph is captured by Tarak's rebel Sufi tribe who are sworn to protect the Jewel so he can fulfill his people's destiny.

After encountering a Nubian mountain tribe, Joan and Jack's romance is rekindled. Joan tells Jack that the jewel is not a gem stone but Al-Julhara. In Kadir, Omar intends to use a smoke-and-mirror special effect provided by a British rock promoter to convince onlookers that he is the prophet who will unite the Arab world. Jack, Joan, and Al-Julhara arrive to expose Omar but are captured. Omar suspends Jack and Joan with ropes over a deep pit (a scenario taken from Joan's biggest-selling novel, The Savage Secret) while Al-Julhara is in a stockade. Ralph, along with the Sufi tribe, arrives in time to rescue the three prisoners.

As Omar takes center stage to address the Arab people, Jack and Joan disrupt the ceremony while the Sufi battle Omar's guards. A fire breaks out, engulfing Omar's stage. Jack and Joan are separated, and Omar corners Joan atop the burning scaffolding. Ralph, using a giant crane, helps Jack reach Joan in the nick of time; he kicks Omar over the side and down into the flames, killing him. Al-Julhara rises and safely walks through the blazing inferno, fulfilling the prophecy that he is the true spiritual leader.

The following day, Jack and Joan are married by Al-Julhara. While Ralph is genuinely happy for Jack and Joan, he laments once again having gained nothing for his efforts, but Tarak acknowledges that he is a true Sufi friend and presents him with a jeweled dagger as Jack and Joan happily sail away down the Nile.

Cast

 Michael Douglas as Jack Colton
 Kathleen Turner as Joan Wilder Colton
 Danny DeVito as Ralph
 Spiros Focás as Omar Khalifa
 Avner Eisenberg as Al-Julhara
 Hamid Fillali as Rachid
 Daniel Peacock as Rock Promoter
 Holland Taylor as Gloria Horne
 Guy Cuevas as Le Vasseur
 Peter DePalma as Missionary (as Peter De Palma)
 Mark Daly Richards as Pirate
 The Flying Karamazov Brothers
 Paul David Magid as Tarak
 Howard Jay Patterson as Barak
 Randall Edwin Nelson as Karak
 Samuel Ross Williams as Arak
 Timothy Daniel Furst as Sarak

Production
With a $21 million budget, principal photography began April 22, 1985 with filming wrapped on July 25, 1985. Location shooting took place at Villefranche-sur-Mer and the Palais des Festivals et des Congrès, Cannes, France, Ait Benhaddou near Ouarzazate and Meknes, Morocco, among other locations, including Zion National Park, Springdale, Utah.

At the time, both Kathleen Turner and Michael Douglas only made the sequel because they were contractually obligated to do so, although Douglas was much more invested in the film as its producer. At one point during pre-production, Turner tried to back out of the project because she found the script "terrible, formulaic, sentimental", until 20th Century Fox threatened her with a $25 million lawsuit for breach of contract. Douglas intervened on her behalf and ensured that a rewrite was made.

Turner was disappointed that Douglas did not ask Diane Thomas, the writer who had penned the script for Romancing the Stone, to return for the sequel, apparently because he decided her asking price was too high. When Douglas agreed to undertake rewrites to please Turner, Thomas was asked to consult on alterations, but Turner remained disappointed with the script. She elaborated in an interview in 2018: 

Turner, Douglas and DeVito would later reunite in the unrelated film The War of the Roses.

Filming in North Africa was dogged with problems from unbearable 120-degree-Fahrenheit heat to problems with the local crew but the most troubling concern was that the director showed that he was not up to the task of helming an action film. After one massive night scene that was hours in setup, and cast and crew in place, it was only then that someone noticed that there was no film in the cameras. As producer, Michael Douglas exploded; the whole debacle had to be re-filmed another day, only after the raw film stock was finally located. More problems with local customs cropped up, with film and equipment mysteriously held up by customs until the requisite bribes were paid. In the end, being only three weeks behind schedule was a minor triumph for Douglas.

Approximately two weeks before principal photography began, an aircraft carrying Richard Dawking (production designer) and Brian Coates (production manager) crashed during location scouting over the countryside of Morocco, killing all on board. The film is dedicated to the memory of Dawking and Coates, as well as screenwriter Diane Thomas, who had died in an automobile accident six weeks before the film's release. During filming in Morocco, Douglas and Turner, flying in an executive jet aircraft, had a near-accident when their aircraft wing struck the runway in a heavy landing.

The use of a General Dynamics F-16 Fighting Falcon mockup was a key element of the main characters' escaping from a fortified town. The wooden, styrofoam and fibreglass mockup was built on an automobile chassis and powered by a 350ci Chevrolet engine.

As with the first film, the novelization of the sequel was credited to Joan Wilder, the character played by Kathleen Turner; both books were actually ghostwritten by Catherine Lanigan.

The Jewel of the Nile was the final film released on the RCA SelectaVision CED video format. It was also released in other media formats.

Soundtrack
"When the Going Gets Tough, the Tough Get Going", performed by Billy Ocean, and "The Jewel of the Nile", performed by Precious Wilson, play during the film and in the end credits respectively. Douglas, Turner, and DeVito also co-starred with Ocean in the MTV music video of the same name. The soundtrack features 1980s rap group Whodini and their single "Freaks Come Out at Night" as Michael Douglas and company make their way through the desert on camel back as well as "Party (No Sheep Is Safe Tonight)" by The Willesden Dodgers during the campfire party scene.

Arista released a soundtrack album on record, cassette and compact disc.

 When the Going Gets Tough, the Tough Get Going – Billy Ocean (5:43)
 I'm in Love – Ruby Turner (3:30)
 African Breeze – Hugh Masekela and Jonathan Butler (6:00)
 Party (No Sheep Is Safe Tonight) – The Willesden Dodgers (5:10)
 Freaks Come Out at Night – Whodini (4:44)
 The Jewel of the Nile – Precious Wilson (4:18)
 Legion (Here I Come) – Mark Shreeve (4:49)
 Nubian Dance – The Nubians (3:35)
 Love Theme – Jack Nitzsche (2:26)
 The Plot Thickens – Jack Nitzsche (4:15)

Charts

Reception
While The Jewel of the Nile grossed almost as much as its predecessor, the film was much less successful critically and effectively killed the franchise.

Critics felt the film was loaded with numerous plot holes and that it lacked the first film's original charm. The New York Times opened its review by writing, "There's nothing in The Jewel of the Nile that wasn't funnier or more fanciful in Romancing the Stone." Roger Ebert agreed that "... it is not quite the equal of Romancing the Stone," but praised the interplay between Douglas and Turner. "It seems clear," he wrote, "that they like each other and are having fun during the parade of ludicrous situations in the movie, and their chemistry is sometimes more entertaining than the contrivances of the plot."

Colin Greenland reviewed The Jewel of the Nile for White Dwarf #77, and stated that "The Jewel of the Nile is the sequel to Romancing the Stone, another adventure fantasy with just the right pinch of preposterousness. Against all odds, this is a sequel as enjoyable and endearing as the original."

The Jewel of the Nile holds a rating of 46% on Rotten Tomatoes based on 26 reviews. The critical consensus reads: "The sense of romantic spark has waned and the prevalence of stereotypes has grown in Jewel of the Nile, although there is still plenty of swooning action for fans of the first adventure."

Then-U.S. President Ronald Reagan viewed this film at Camp David in January 1986.

Unproduced sequels
Talk of a third film, again starring Douglas, Turner and DeVito, never got beyond a draft. In The Crimson Eagle, Jack and Joan take their two teenage kids to Thailand where they are blackmailed into stealing a priceless statue. The project languished until 1997, when Douglas as tentative producer, announced he was no longer interested.

In 2005 and again in 2008, Douglas was working on a second sequel, entitled Racing the Monsoon, although there have been no further developments in recent years. Since 2007, Fox considered a remake of Romancing the Stone with the possibility of a "reboot" of a series. The roles of Jack and Joan would be filled by Taylor Kitsch (or Gerard Butler) and Katherine Heigl. By 2011, the remake was re-worked as a television series.

See also
 High Risk (1981)
 Green Ice (1981)
 Romancing the Stone (1984)
 Florida Straits (1986)
 The Lost City (2022)

Notes

References

Sources

 Eliot, Marc. Michael Douglas: A Biography. New York: Three Rivers Press, 2013. .
 Solomon, Aubrey. Twentieth Century-Fox: A Corporate and Financial History (The Scarecrow Filmmakers Series). Lanham, Maryland: Scarecrow Press, 1988. .
 Turner, Kathleen. Send Yourself Roses: Thoughts on My Life, Love, and Leading Roles. New York: Springboard Press, 2008. .

External links
 
 
 

1985 films
1985 romantic comedy films
1980s action adventure films
1980s adventure comedy films
20th Century Fox films
American action adventure films
American adventure comedy films
American romantic comedy films
American sequel films
1980s English-language films
Films scored by Jack Nitzsche
Films directed by Lewis Teague
Films produced by Michael Douglas
Films about writers
Films set in Africa
Films set in a fictional country
Films shot in France
Films shot in Monaco
Films shot in Morocco
Films shot in Utah
Treasure hunt films
1980s American films